Ralph M. Sharpe Airport  is a privately owned, public use airport in Tunica County, Mississippi, United States. It is located two nautical miles (4 km) south of the central business district of Tunica, Mississippi.

Facilities and aircraft 
Ralph M. Sharpe Airport covers an area of 10 acres (4 ha) at an elevation of 195 feet (59 m) above mean sea level. It has one runway designated 1/19 with an asphalt and turf surface measuring 2,508 by 80 feet (764 x 24 m).

For the 12-month period ending December 2, 2010, the airport had 3,040 general aviation aircraft operations, an average of 253 per month. At that time there were two single-engine aircraft based at this airport.

See also 
 List of airports in Mississippi

References

External links 
 

Airports in Mississippi
Transportation in Tunica County, Mississippi
Buildings and structures in Tunica County, Mississippi